Lupinus magnificus, commonly known as Panamint Mountain lupine, is a species of flowering plant from the order of Lamiales.

References

magnificus
Endemic flora of California
Flora of the California desert regions
Natural history of the Mojave Desert
Death Valley National Park
Panamint Range
Natural history of Inyo County, California
Flora without expected TNC conservation status